Albert Jones  ( – 1963) was a Welsh international footballer. He was part of the Wales national football team between 1905 and 1906, playing 2 matches. He played his first match on 22 March 1905 against England and his last match on 19 March 1906 against England. At club level, he played for Notts County and Nottingham Forest.

See also
 List of Wales international footballers (alphabetical)

References

1883 births

1963 deaths

Place of birth missing

Date of death missing
Welsh footballers

Wales international footballers

Notts County F.C. players
Nottingham Forest F.C. players
Wales amateur international footballers
Association footballers not categorized by position